AEW Revolution is an annual professional wrestling pay-per-view (PPV) event produced by All Elite Wrestling (AEW). Established by the promotion in 2020, the event is held in late February/early March. The 2021 event was AEW's first PPV held on a Sunday. It is considered one of the "Big Four" PPVs for AEW, along with Double or Nothing, All Out, and Full Gear, the company's biggest shows produced quarterly.

The first two Revolution PPVs were critically acclaimed. The 2020 event was voted as the Best Major Wrestling Show of the year for the Wrestling Observer Newsletter awards, while the 2021 event was the highest-grossing non-WWE wrestling PPV since 1999. The latter was also AEW's largest attended event during the COVID-19 pandemic up to that point.

History
The inaugural Revolution event took place on February 29, 2020, at the Wintrust Arena in Chicago, Illinois, and was held in partnership between All Elite Wrestling (AEW) and the Chicago Comic & Entertainment Expo (C2E2). This inaugural event would be AEW's last pay-per-view (PPV) held before the start of the COVID-19 pandemic, which moved the majority of AEW's shows to Daily's Place in Jacksonville, Florida. Later that year, AEW President and Chief Executive Officer Tony Khan referred to Revolution as being one of the promotion's "big four" PPVs, their four biggest shows of the year produced quarterly, along with Double or Nothing, All Out, and Full Gear. A second Revolution was then held on March 7, 2021. The second event was originally scheduled for February 27, but due to the Canelo Alvarez vs. Avni Yildirim bout in Miami Gardens, Florida airing that same night, AEW rescheduled Revolution for Sunday, March 7, which in turn made it AEW's first PPV to be held on a Sunday; the promotion had considered Saturday, March 6, but UFC 259 was airing that night.

AEW resumed live touring with fans in July 2021. In turn, the 2022 Revolution was held on March 6 of that year at the Addition Financial Arena in Orlando, Florida. It was the culmination of a three-day event, with an episode of Rampage and a fanfest taking place on March 4 and 5, respectively, at the same venue.

For the 2020 Wrestling Observer Newsletter awards, the inaugural Revolution event was voted as the Best Major Wrestling Show of the year. The following year's event became the highest grossing non-WWE wrestling PPV since 1999. It was also AEW's largest attended event during the COVID-19 pandemic up to that point, with an estimated 1,300 spectators.

Events

See also
List of All Elite Wrestling pay-per-view events

References

External links
All Elite Wrestling Official website

 
Recurring events established in 2020